Kingman Pass el.  is a mountain pass between Terrance Mountain and Bunsen Peak on the Grand Loop Road (U.S. Route 89), just south of Mammoth Hot Springs in Yellowstone National Park.  The pass is named for Lieutenant Dan Christie Kingman of the U.S. Army Corps of Engineers.  Kingman rebuilt this difficult portion of the Grand Loop Road in the area known as The Golden Gate in 1883.

Notes

Landforms of Yellowstone National Park
Mountain passes of Wyoming
Landforms of Park County, Wyoming